The Republic of Liberia is divided into fifteen counties.  Each is administered by a superintendent appointed by the President.

Counties

See also
List of Liberian counties by Human Development Index
Administrative divisions of Liberia
ISO 3166-2:LR

References

External links
 
Official Liberian Census Final Results 2008

 
Subdivisions of Liberia
Liberia, Counties
Liberia 1
Counties, Liberia
Counties
Liberia